Histone-lysine N-methyltransferase SETDB1 is an enzyme that in humans is encoded by the SETDB1 gene. SETDB1 is also known as KMT1E or H3K9 methyltransferase ESET.

Function 

The SET domain is a highly conserved, approximately 150-amino acid motif implicated in the modulation of chromatin structure. It was originally identified as part of a larger conserved region present in the Drosophila Trithorax protein and was subsequently identified in the Drosophila Su(var)3-9 and 'Enhancer of zeste' proteins, from which the acronym SET is derived. Studies have suggested that the SET domain may be a signature of proteins that modulate transcriptionally active or repressed chromatin states through chromatin remodeling activities.

Model organisms

				
Model organisms have been used in the study of SETDB1 function. A conditional knockout mouse line, called Setdb1tm1a(EUCOMM)Wtsi was generated as part of the International Knockout Mouse Consortium program — a high-throughput mutagenesis project to generate and distribute animal models of disease to interested scientists.

Male and female animals underwent a standardized phenotypic screen to determine the effects of deletion.  Twenty seven tests were carried out on mutant mice and four significant abnormalities were observed. No homozygous mutant embryos were identified during gestation, and therefore none survived until weaning. The remaining tests were carried out on heterozygous mutant adult mice and two significant abnormalities were observed. Females had abnormal peripheral blood lymphocytes data and both sexes displayed increased bone strength and mineral content.

Zebrafish are an important model organism to study developmental biology and have been used to study cancer genetics. A screen to identify new oncogenes in melanoma performed in zebrafish identified SETDB1 as an oncogene that cooperates with another cancer gene, BRAF, to accelerate melanoma onset. Subsequent reports have linked SETDB1 to hepatocellular carcinoma

Interactions 

SETDB1 has been shown to interact with TRIM28.>

See also 
SETD1A, a protein that is highly homologous to SETDB1

References

Further reading

External links 
 
 

Genes mutated in mice